Skafi (Greek: Σκάφη) is a community and a small village in Chania regional unit on the island of Crete, Greece. It is part of the municipal unit of East Selino (Anatoliko Selino). The community consists of the following villages (population in 2011):
Skafi, pop. 31
Argastiri, pop. 19
Pera Skafi, pop. 27

References

Populated places in Chania (regional unit)